Josiah A. Harris (January 15, 1808 – August 21, 1876) was the ninth Mayor of Cleveland, Ohio in 1847.

Harris moved from Becket, Massachusetts in 1818 to North Amherst in Lorain County.  Harris was elected sheriff of Elyria in 1832 and began the Ohio Atlas & Elyria Advertiser, a weekly newspaper.  Harris moved to Cleveland in 1837 and purchased the Cleveland Herald and Gazette, where he proudly supported the Whig party.  He was elected mayor 10 years later in 1847.  He began to lose interest in the Herald and ended up quitting journalism altogether after the Civil War.  He retired to a farm in Rocky River.  Harris suffered a series of strokes and died at his daughter's home.  He is buried in the Erie Street Cemetery.

Harris married Esther M. Race in 1830 and had four children:  Bryon C., Brougham E., Zacharia, and Helen.

References
 The Encyclopedia Of Cleveland History by Cleveland Bicentennial Commission (Cleveland, Ohio), David D. Van Tassel (Editor), and John J. Grabowski (Editor) 

Mayors of Cleveland
1808 births
1876 deaths
Ohio Whigs
19th-century American politicians
Burials at Erie Street Cemetery